Katty Patricia Tóffoli Andrade is a Venezuelan beauty pageant titleholder, born in Caracas on October 7, 1960. She was the official representative of Venezuela to the Miss World 1978 pageant held in London, United Kingdom, on November 16, 1978, when she reached the top 15.

References

External links
Miss Venezuela official website
Miss World official website

1960 births
Living people
People from Caracas
Miss Venezuela World winners
Miss World 1978 delegates